Beng Mealea ("Temple of Lotus Pond"), or Boeng Mealea, is a temple from the Angkor Wat period located  east of the main group of temples at Angkor, Cambodia, on the ancient royal highway to Preah Khan Kompong Svay.

The temple

Beng Mealea was built as a Hindu temple, but some carvings depict Buddhist motifs. Its primary material is sandstone and it is largely unrestored, with trees and thick brush thriving amidst its towers and courtyards and many of its stones lying in great heaps. For years it was difficult to reach, but a road recently built to the temple complex of Koh Ker passes Beng Mealea and more visitors are coming to the site, as it is 77 km from Siem Reap by road.

The history of the temple is unknown and it can be dated only by its architectural style, identical to Angkor Wat, so scholars assumed it was built during the reign of king Suryavarman II in the early 12th century. Smaller in size than Angkor Wat, the king's main monument, Beng Mealea nonetheless ranks among the Khmer empire's larger temples: the gallery which forms the outer enclosure of the temple is 181 m by 152 m. It was the center of a town, surrounded by a moat 1025 m by 875 m large and 45 m wide.

Beng Mealea is oriented toward the east, but has entranceways from the other three cardinal directions. The basic layout is three enclosing galleries around a central sanctuary, collapsed at present. The enclosures are tied with "cruciform cloisters", like Angkor Wat. Structures known as libraries lie to the right and left of the avenue that leads in from the east. There is extensive carving of scenes from Hindu mythology, including the Churning of the Sea of Milk and Vishnu being borne by the bird god Garuda. Causeways have long balustrades formed by bodies of the seven-headed Naga serpent.

It was built mostly of sandstone: Beng Mealea is only 7 km far from the angkorian sandstone quarries of Phnom Kulen, as the crow flies. Presumably sandstone blocks used for Angkor were transported along artificial water canals and passed from here. Despite of lack of information, the quality of architecture and decorations has drawn the attention of French scholars just from its discovery.

World Heritage Status
This site was added to the UNESCO World Heritage Tentative List on March 27,2020 (originally proclaimed December 1,1992) in the Cultural category .

Gallery

References

Bibliography

External links
A Pilgrimage to Beng Mealea by Willard Van De Bogart
Beng Mealea re-visited on Andy Brouwer's website
 "Death of an Angel: How antiquities theft destroys Cambodia's past...and future" - Article about Beng Mealea site damage
 Beng Mealea - Gallery and Photographic Documentation by khmer-heritage.de
 Photos from inside Beng Mealea

Hindu temples in Siem Reap Province
Angkorian sites in Siem Reap Province